Sun House can be:
The Sun House, Grace Hudson's 1911 redwood Craftsman bungalow home, is adjacent to the Grace Hudson Museum in Ukiah, California
The Sun House, a Grade II* listed Modernist house in Hampstead, London
House of Suns: a 2008 science fiction novel
Sunhouse: short-lived Nottingham based band

See also
The House of the Sun (disambiguation)
Son House